Freshman Dorm is an American drama television series which debuted in the summer of 1992 and aired 5 episodes on CBS. It is based on the young adult fiction series of the same name written by Linda Alper Cooney.

Plot 

The series followed the lives of three dormmates, Molly, K.C. and Lulu, who live in a co-ed dormitory at the fictional Western Pacific University in southern California.

Cast 

Paige French as Louise "Lulu" Victoria Abercrombie: a pretty, spoiled rich girl from New York City who used anything to get what she wanted
Robyn Lively as Molly Flynn: a theater major from Milwaukee, who had aspirations of becoming an actress 
Arlene Taylor as K.C. Richards (née Kamala Consuelo Ricardo): a lower-class Hispanic girl from Los Angeles on financial aid who is ashamed of her background
Matthew Fox as Danny Foley: Molly's boyfriend who is on athletic scholarship 
Casper Van Dien as Zack Taylor: a free-spirited surfer with little interest in his studies 
Kevin Mambo as Alex Woods: Zack's studious roommate, a biology major

Episodes

Production 

Exterior scenes for the show were shot at Whittier College.

References

External links 
 
 

1992 American television series debuts
1992 American television series endings
1990s American college television series
1990s American drama television series
CBS original programming
Television shows set in California
English-language television shows